Q'uwa Laki (Aymara q'uwa a medical plant, laki distribution; a wise person specialized in healing diseases, Hispanicized spelling Coalaque) is a mountain in the Andes of Peru, about  high . It is located in the Moquegua Region, General Sánchez Cerro Province, on the border of the districts Coalaque, Matalaque and Omate. Q'uwa Laki lies southeast of the peaks of Qillqata and Wilani.

References 

Mountains of Moquegua Region
Mountains of Peru